Sadık Perinçek (1915 in Kemaliye – 13 September 2000) was the deputy Chief Prosecutor of the Supreme Court of Turkey and a parliamentary deputy in the 1950s and 1960s. He was the father of politician Doğu Perinçek.

Career
Perinçek was elected in the 1954 general election for the Democratic Party, representing Erzincan Province until the 1957 elections, in which he was not elected. In the 1961 general election he was elected again for the New Turkey Party. In the 1965 general election and 1969 general election he was elected for the Justice Party.

References

1915 births
2000 deaths
People from Kemaliye
Democrat Party (Turkey, 1946–1961) politicians
New Turkey Party (1961) politicians
20th-century Turkish politicians
Justice Party (Turkey) politicians
Deputies of Erzincan
Istanbul University Faculty of Law alumni